George Hucks (born 18 January 1968) is an Australian wheelchair rugby player. Born in the South Australian town of Port Augusta, he took up wheelchair rugby in 1994 and began playing for the Australian Steelers in 1995. During a practice in Atlanta before the 1996 Summer Paralympics, Hucks, the team's best player, broke his kneecap. He was part of the national team at the 2000 Sydney, 2004 Athens, and 2008 Beijing Paralympics, and won silver medals at the 2000 and 2008 games with the team. He works as a funds officer.

References

External links
 

1968 births
Living people
Paralympic wheelchair rugby players of Australia
Paralympic silver medalists for Australia
Paralympic medalists in wheelchair rugby
Wheelchair rugby players at the 2000 Summer Paralympics
Wheelchair rugby players at the 2004 Summer Paralympics
Wheelchair rugby players at the 2008 Summer Paralympics
Medalists at the 2000 Summer Paralympics
Medalists at the 2008 Summer Paralympics
Sportsmen from South Australia
People from Port Augusta